Kashkak (also Romanized as Qeshlāq and Qishlāq) is a village in Pachehlak-e Sharqi Rural District, in the Central District of Aligudarz County, Lorestan Province, Iran. At the 2006 census, its population was 523, in 103 families.

References 

Towns and villages in Aligudarz County